Oliver St John, 1st Earl of Bolingbroke, KB (1580? – June/July 1646), known from 1618 until 1624 as 4th Baron St John of Bletso, was an English nobleman and politician.

Life

St John was son and heir of Oliver St John, 3rd Baron St John of Bletso, by his wife Dorothy Reid, daughter and heiress of Sir John Rede or Reid, of Oddington, Gloucestershire. He matriculated from Peterhouse, Cambridge, in about 1595 and was admitted at Gray's Inn on 20 April 1597.

St John was elected as a Member of Parliament for Bedfordshire in 1601, and again in 1604. In 1604, he served on the committee appointed to discuss the change in the royal title. On 3 June 1610, he was made Knight of the Bath at the creation of Henry Frederick, Prince of Wales.

In September 1618, he succeeded his father; in the following year he sumptuously entertained James I at his house, and, in 1620, he took his seat in the House of Lords. On 28 December 1624, he was created Earl of Bolingbroke (a manor that had belonged to the Beauchamp family, from which he was descended). He took his seat on 22 June 1625.

In December 1626, St John refused to contribute to the forced loan; but in 1638–9 he contributed towards the expenses of the Bishops' War. On 28 August 1640, he signed the petition of the twelve peers, attributing the evils of the day to the absence of parliaments, and urging Charles I to summon one. He remained with the Long Parliament in 1642 when Charles retired to York, and, in February 1642–43, was named by the parliament lord lieutenant of Bedfordshire; in this capacity he took an active part in raising the militia and providing for the safety of the shire. In the same year he took the Solemn League and Covenant, and was appointed a lay member of the Westminster Assembly. 

On 10 November he was one of the commissioners named for the custody of the Great Seal. In 1645 he was excused attendance at the House of Lords, and he died in June or July 1646.

Family
St John married, in April 1602, Elizabeth, daughter of William Paulet and granddaughter of Sir George Paulet, brother of William Paulet, 1st Marquess of Winchester. They had four sons and three daughters:
Oliver St John, 5th Baron St John of Bletso (1603–1642), married Lady Abrabella Egerton and left four daughters
Sir Paulet St John, KB (d. 1638), married Elizabeth, daughter of Sir Rowland Vaughan (d. 1641) of St. Mary Spital (now Spitalfields), and had three sons:
Oliver St John, 2nd Earl of Bolingbroke (d. 1688)
Paulet St John, 3rd Earl of Bolingbroke (1634–1711)
Francis St John, educated at Corpus Christi College, Cambridge, died unmarried
Francis St John, died unmarried
Anthony St John (c.1618–1673), married Ann Keynsham (d. 1700), of Tempsford
Elizabeth St John, died young
Dorothy St John (d. 1628), married John Carey, 2nd Earl of Dover, without issue
Barbara St John, died young

His eldest son Oliver was mortally wounded at the Battle of Edgehill in 1642 and predeceased him, leaving only daughters. When Bolingbroke died in 1646, the earldom passed to his grandson Oliver, the eldest son of Bolingbroke's second son Sir Paulet St John.

His five younger brothers, Rowland, Anthony, Alexander, Beauchamp and Henry all became MPs.

References

Sources

1580s births
1646 deaths
Alumni of Peterhouse, Cambridge
Members of Gray's Inn
English subscribers to the Solemn League and Covenant 1643
Knights of the Bath
Lay members of the Westminster Assembly
Lord-Lieutenants of Bedfordshire
Lord-Lieutenants of Huntingdonshire
Oliver
English MPs 1601
English MPs 1604–1611
1
Barons St John of Bletso